Sonnet 49 is one of 154 sonnets written by the English playwright and poet William Shakespeare. It is a member of the Fair Youth sequence, in which the poet expresses his love towards a young man.

Structure
Sonnet 49 is an English or Shakespearean sonnet. The English sonnet contains three quatrains followed by a final rhyming couplet, for a total of fourteen lines. It follows the form's typical rhyme scheme, ABAB CDCD EFEF GG, and is written in iambic pentameter, a type of poetic metre based on five pairs of metrically weak/strong syllabic positions. Line thirteen exemplifies a regular iambic pentameter:

 ×  /     ×    /   ×   /     ×    /     ×   / 
To leave poor me thou hast the strength of laws, (49.13)
/ = ictus, a metrically strong syllabic position. × = nonictus.

Line ten's "desert" would have been for Shakespeare a full rhyme with "part", as is suggested by the Quarto's spelling, "desart".

Notes

Further reading

External links
Analysis

British poems
Sonnets by William Shakespeare